The Gonzaga Bulldogs men's basketball statistical leaders are individual statistical leaders of the Gonzaga Bulldogs men's basketball program in various categories, including points, three-pointers, rebounds, assists, steals, and blocks. Within those areas, the lists identify single-game, single-season, and career leaders. The Bulldogs represent Gonzaga University in the NCAA Division I West Coast Conference.

Gonzaga began competing in intercollegiate basketball in 1907. However, the school's record book does not generally list records from before the 1950s, as records from before this period are often incomplete and inconsistent. Since scoring was much lower in this era, and teams played much fewer games during a typical season, it is likely that few or no players from this era would appear on these lists anyway.

Official NCAA basketball records date only to the 1937–38 season, the first of what it calls the "modern era" of men's basketball, following the abolition of the center jump after each made basket. Official statistical rankings in scoring began in 1947–48. Individual assists and rebounds were first recorded in the 1950–51 season. Rebounds have been recorded in each subsequent season, but the NCAA stopped recording individual assists after the 1951–52 season, not resuming this practice until the 1983–84 season. Blocks and steals were first officially recorded in 1985–86, and three-pointers followed in 1986–87, the first season in which the three-pointer was made mandatory throughout college men's basketball at a standardized distance. Gonzaga's record books, however, include all of the school's basketball seasons, regardless of whether the NCAA officially recorded statistics in the relevant seasons.

These lists are updated through Gonzaga's game against Grand Canyon in the first round of the 2023 NCAA tournament. Active players are indicated in bold.

Scoring

Three-pointers

Rebounds

Assists

Steals

Blocks

References

Lists of college basketball statistical leaders by team
Statistical